Colonel James Jabara Airport  is a public airport located  northeast of the central business district of Wichita, a city in Sedgwick County, Kansas, United States. It is named in honor of World War II and Korean War flying ace James Jabara, an American of Lebanese descent who has the distinction of being the first American jet ace.

Although most U.S. airports use the same three-letter location identifier for the FAA and IATA, Colonel James Jabara Airport is assigned AAO by the FAA but has no designation from the IATA (which assigned AAO to Anaco Airport in Anaco, Venezuela).

Facilities and aircraft 

 Runway 18/36: , surface: concrete
 Helipad H1: , surface: concrete

For 12-month period ending August 13, 2019, the airport had 38,300 aircraft operations, an average of 104 per day: 97% general aviation and 3% air taxi. In November 2021, there were 113 aircraft based at this airport: 60 single-engine, 31 multi-engine, 20 jet aircraft, 1 helicopter and 1 military.

Incidents 
On November 20, 2013, at approximately 9:30 pm CST, a Boeing 747-400 Dreamlifter with registration N780BA and operated by Atlas Air, mistakenly landed at the Colonel James Jabara Airport, which was on the same heading as its destination, McConnell Air Force Base. After landing at McConnell, the plane was to taxi over to nearby Spirit AeroSystems, and pick up some fuselage parts for the assembly of Boeing 787 Dreamliners in Everett, Washington.  The plane successfully took off at 1:15 pm CST on November 21 and landed at nearby McConnell AFB.  The NTSB opened an investigation about the wrong landing.

Nearby airports

Other airports in Wichita
 Wichita Dwight D. Eisenhower National Airport
 Beech Factory Airport
 Cessna Aircraft Field
 McConnell Air Force Base
 Westport Airport

Other airports in metro
 Augusta Municipal Airport
 Lloyd Stearman Field (Benton)
Other airports in region
 List of airports in Kansas
 List of airports in Oklahoma

References

External links 

Airports in Kansas
Economy of Wichita, Kansas
Transportation in Wichita, Kansas
Buildings and structures in Wichita, Kansas